Undulambia vitrinalis is a moth in the family Crambidae. It was described by Cajetan von Felder, Rudolf Felder and Alois Friedrich Rogenhofer in 1875. It is found in Guyana.

References

Moths described in 1875
Musotiminae